Porgy and Bess is an opera by George Gershwin.

Porgy and Bess may also refer to:

Highlights from Porgy and Bess, a 1935 recording of selections from the opera
Porgy and Bess (1950 album), a recording of selections from the opera featuring Risë Stevens and Robert Merrill
Porgy and Bess (1951 album), the first complete recording of the opera
Porgy and Bess (film), the 1959 film directed by Otto Preminger
Porgy and Bess (Glyndebourne album), the 1988 Glyndebourne Festival recording of the opera
Porgy and Bess (Harry Belafonte and Lena Horne album), 1959
Porgy & Bess (Joe Henderson album), 1997
Porgy and Bess (Ella Fitzgerald and Louis Armstrong album), 1957
Porgy and Bess (Hank Jones album), released in 1959
Porgy and Bess (Miles Davis album), released in 1959
Porgy and Bess (Sammy Davis Jr. and Carmen McRae album), 1959
Porgy & Bess (Mundell Lowe album), 1958 
Porgy & Bess (Buddy Collette album), 1959 
Porgy and Bess (Oscar Peterson and Joe Pass album), 1976
Porgy and Bess: A Symphonic Picture, a 1942 symphonic arrangement by Robert Russell Bennett
Selections from George Gershwin's Folk Opera Porgy and Bess, recordings by members of the original cast
The Complete Porgy and Bess, a 1956 jazz recording featuring Mel Tormé
The Gershwins' Porgy and Bess, a 2006 recording based on the opera's original 1935 production

See also
Porgy and Bess discography, a list of recordings